Henry Dewey Louis Hudson (May 16, 1898 - June 24, 1975) was a Canadian ice hockey player.

He is an Olympian who competed at the 1928 Winter Olympics in St. Moritz in ice hockey where the Canada national men's ice hockey team won a gold team medal.

References

1898 births
1975 deaths
Olympic gold medalists for Canada
Medalists at the 1928 Winter Olympics
Olympic ice hockey players of Canada
Ice hockey players at the 1928 Winter Olympics